The Harbor Defense Museum, sometimes called The Caponier, located within the grounds of Fort Hamilton in the Bay Ridge section of Brooklyn is  a 19th-century fort, New York City's only military museum and one of only seventy military museums in the United States that is funded and operated by the Defense Department.

Caponiers, the technical name of the structure that now houses the museum, are outworks; in the case of Fort Hamilton its mission was to protect the main fortress from rear attacks. Originally a small fort within the larger fort, it now serves as the guardian of Fort Hamilton's history. Robert E. Lee served at Fort Hamilton in the 1840s, when there was only one Army.
Because it was used as a warehouse after it was no longer needed for military purposes, it was better preserved than other parts of the fort. While the museum and fort were in danger of closing in the mid-1990s due to budget cuts, it was preserved due to an agreement between the fort and the United States Army Center of Military History and preservation efforts of the Fort Hamilton Historic Society. The museum continues to serve an educational role in explaining the history of the evolution of New York Harbor.

Fort Hamilton is the "second-oldest continuously garrisoned federal post in the nation", second only to West Point and its ties to the community are part of the charm of the museum and the fort. Although The Caponier was always prepared for battle, with a 24-pound cannon aimed at New York Harbor, the fort never experienced a battle. The museum houses an array of artifacts from New York's military history including American Revolutionary War relics, uniforms from various wars, old maps of the fort, the post's old switchboard, an exhibit on a secret tunnel that connected Fort Hamilton with another base a half-mile away, a Confederate mine and a piece of the net that protected New York Harbor from German U-boats in World War I. It is also the temporary home of a Bay Ridge time capsule that was unearthed prematurely due to construction.

References

External links
Official Facebook page
Harbor Defense Museum website (dead link 30 Nov 2016)
Harbor Defense Museum at NYC Arts.org

Museums in Brooklyn
Military and war museums in New York (state)
United States Army museums
Museums established in 1980
Bay Ridge, Brooklyn
1980 establishments in New York City